Bécancour is a regional county municipality in the Centre-du-Québec region of Quebec, Canada. Its seat is Bécancour.

Subdivisions
There are 12 subdivisions and one native reserve within the RCM:

Cities & Towns (1)
 Bécancour

Municipalities (8)
 Deschaillons-sur-Saint-Laurent
 Fortierville
 Lemieux
 Manseau
 Saint-Pierre-les-Becquets
 Saint-Sylvère
 Sainte-Françoise
 Sainte-Marie-de-Blandford

Parishes (3)
 Parisville
 Sainte-Cécile-de-Lévrard
 Sainte-Sophie-de-Lévrard

Native Reserves (1)(not associated with RCM)
 Wôlinak

Demographics
Mother tongue from 2016 Canadian Census

Transportation

Access Routes
Highways and numbered routes that run through the municipality, including external routes that start or finish at the county border:

 Autoroutes
 
 
 

 Principal Highways
 

 Secondary Highways
 
 
 
 
 

 External Routes
 None

See also
 List of regional county municipalities and equivalent territories in Quebec

References

External links
 Official Bécancour Web Site

 
Census divisions of Quebec